Salvia somalensis (Somalia sage) is a perennial shrub endemic to a limited range and elevation in Somalia.

The pale wisteria-blue flowers grow in tight, many-flowered whorls, growing on inflorescences that are unusual in that they do not always grow on the terminal ends of stems.

Notes

somalensis
Flora of Somalia